Soltankənd or Soltankend may refer to:
Soltankənd, Ismailli, Azerbaijan
Soltankənd, Jalilabad, Azerbaijan